Az Zubayr is a city in and the capital of Al-Zubair District, part of the Basra Governorate of Iraq. The city is just south of Basra. The name can also refer to the old Emirate of Zubair.

The name is also sometimes written  Al Zubayr, Al Zubair, Az Zubair, Zubair, Zoubair, El Zubair, or Zobier.

History of Zubair

Early history

The city was named al-Zubair because one of the Sahaba (companions) of the Prophet Muhammad, Zubayr ibn al-Awwam, was buried there.

Recent history
During the Ottoman times, the city was a self-ruling Sheikhdom ruled by a Sheikh from Najdi families, such as Al Zuhair, Al Meshry, Al Rashed, and Al ibrahim families. Like other Sheikdoms under the Ottoman Empire, the Sheikdom of Zubair used to pay dues and receive protection from the Ottomans. In the 19th century, the city of Zubair witnessed relatively large migrations from Najd. Up until the 1970s and 1980s, the town was predominantly populated by people who moved from Najed. Now only a few families remain of the old inhabitants. Most of them moved back to Najd and other regions of Saudi Arabia. In the period of Najdi is inhabitance the city it was dominated by the Sunni denomination of Islam, unlike the Shia Basra nearby.

21st century
By 2008, the city of Zubair had a population of around 240,000 people and had grown to merge into the Basra metropolitan area with nearly 3 million inhabitants in total. As in Basra, the municipality of Zubair currently has a Shia majority and is barely distinguishable from Basra itself. But, contrary to Basra, Zubair is still home to a large Sunni minority. However, they have faced violence from Shia militants during the Iraqi Civil War, and many have fled to Gulf countries and Sunni areas of Iraq.

Climate
Az Zubayr has a hot desert climate (Köppen climate classification BWh). In winter there is more rainfall than in summer. About  of precipitation falls annually.

References

External links
Iraq Image - Az Zubayr Satellite Observation

District capitals of Iraq
Former emirates
Zubayr